Apatema coarctella is a moth of the family Autostichidae. It is found on the Canary Islands and Madeira.

The wingspan is about 9–10 mm. The ground colour of the forewings is yellowish, sprinkled with blackish-grey. The hindwings are grey.

References

Moths described in 1896
Oegoconiinae